A data clarification form (DCF) or data query form is a questionnaire specifically used in clinical research. The DCF is the primary data clarification tool from the trial sponsor or contract research organization (CRO) towards the investigator to clarify discrepancies and ask the investigator for clarification. The DCF is part of the data validation process in a clinical trial.

See also 

 Case report form
 Clinical data acquisition
 Clinical research associate (CRA)
 Clinical trial
 Clinical trial protocol
 Drug development
 Electronic data capture
 Patient-reported outcome

References 

 Celine Clive (2004), Handbook of SOPs for Good Clinical Practice, CRC,

External links
 DCF entry in Clinical Research Dictionary

Clinical research
Clinical data management